Lossiemouth High School is a secondary school in the coastal town of Lossiemouth, Moray, Scotland.

The school's catchment area includes the nearby villages of Burghead, Hopeman, Cummingston and Duffus. The feeder primaries are Hythehill, St. Gerardine's, Hopeman and Burghead. The pupils are separated into three houses: Kinneddar, Pitgaveny and Spynie. These houses are named after local areas around Lossiemouth. The school rector was Brenda Gifford, who retired in 2012. Linda Brown is the current head of the school. Former rector, William Barber, was awarded an OBE in 1999 as part of the Queens honours list. In 2005 the school was selected to be part of the Schools of Ambition programme.

History 
The former school building was demolished in 2021.

References

External links
Official site
Lossiemouth High School's page on Scottish Schools Online

Secondary schools in Moray
Lossiemouth